Baird's shrew (Sorex bairdi) is a species of mammal in the family Soricidae. It is endemic to northwest Oregon. Baird's shrew inhabits moist conifer forests.

Description

Its fur is darker brown in winter than in summer, when it is brownish-chestnut or olive brown, with paler sides and belly. Males and females are about the same size, which is common among shrews in general. Also like other shrew species, Baird's shrew feeds on insects, worms, snails, and spiders. It shares the forests of its range with six other species of shrew, such as the Pacific shrew.

Subspecies 

Baird's shrew has two subspecies:
Sorex bairdi bairdi, (Merriam, 1895) Type locality: "Oregon, Clatsop County, Astoria"
Sorex bairdi permiliensis, (Jackson, 1918). Type locality: "Permilia Lake, W base Mt. Jefferson, Cascade Range, Marion Co., Oregon."

See also
 List of mammals of Oregon

References

 Don E. Wilson & DeeAnn M. Reeder (editors). 2005. Mammal Species of the World. A Taxonomic and Geographic Reference (3rd ed), Johns Hopkins University Press, 2,142 pp. (Available from Johns Hopkins University Press, 1-800-537-5487 or (410) 516-6900, or at http://www.press.jhu.edu).
 Merriam, C. H.. "North America Fauna, 10: 77." Sorex bairdi. 1985. 7 Apr 2009.

External links 
 

Sorex
Biota of Oregon
Taxonomy articles created by Polbot
Mammals described in 1895
Mammals of Oregon

Endemic fauna of Oregon